World Contact Day was first declared in March 1953 by an organization called the International Flying Saucer Bureau (IFSB), as a day on which all IFSB members would attempt to send a telepathic message into space.

The IFSB voted to hold such a day in 1953, theorising that if both telepathy and alien life were real, a large number of people focussing on an identical piece of text may be able to transmit the message through space. IFSB members focused on the following message during 1953:

The 1953 celebration is referenced in the song "Calling Occupants of Interplanetary Craft", created in 1976 by Klaatu and later covered by The Carpenters.

On the event's 60th anniversary in 2013, World Contact Day was extended to a whole week.

See also 
 World UFO Day
 World Contact Day 2023 online Gathering - OpenContactTV.com / LanugagesOfLights.com

References

Ufology
Unofficial observances
March observances